Tayaran Jet Jsc. was an airline based in Sofia, Bulgaria. It operated both charter services as well as low-cost flights from Trapani, Italy.

History
Founded in 2017, Tayaran Jet initially launched flights in August 2018 as a charter airline. In 2020, the airline began low-cost flights.

Destinations

Tayaran Jet operated scheduled services to the following destinations (as of August 2021):

Fleet
The Tayaran Jet fleet consisted of the following aircraft (as of August 2021):

References

External links

Defunct airlines of Bulgaria
Airlines established in 2017
Airlines disestablished in 2021
Bulgarian brands
Bulgarian companies established in 2017